Balinese mythology is the traditional mythology of the people of the Indonesian island of Bali, before the majority adoption of Hinduism.

Balinese mythology is mainly a kind of animism with some widely known characters and deities. Many themes of Balinese mythology have been adapted and worked into current Balinese Hinduism.

Aspects of Balinese mythology
Antaboga
Bedawang Nala
Barong
Rangda
Setesuyara
Batara Kala
Semara
Tjak
Takshaka
The Awan
Perfumed Heaven
Galungan
Calon Arang
Leyak (or Leák)

Creation myth
At the beginning of time, only Antaboga the world snake existed. Antaboga meditated and created the world turtle Bedwang. Two snakes lie on top of the world turtle, as does the Black Stone, which forms the lid of the underworld. The underworld is ruled by the goddess Setesuyara and the god Batara Kala, who created light and the earth. Above the earth lies a series of skies. Semara, god of love, lives in the floating sky, and above the sky lies the dark blue sky (space), home to the sun and moon. Next is the perfumed sky, which has many beautiful flowers and is inhabited by Tjak, a bird with a human face; the serpent Taksaka; and a group of snakes collectively known as the Awan, who appear as falling stars. The ancestors live in a flame-filled heaven above the perfumed heaven, and finally beyond that is the abode of the gods.

See also
Balinese Hinduism (Agama Hindu Dharma)
Balinese people

 
Creation myths